Son of the South is a 2020 American biographical historical drama film, written and directed by Barry Alexander Brown. Based on Bob Zellner's autobiography, The Wrong Side of Murder Creek: A White Southerner in the Freedom Movement, it stars Lucas Till, Lex Scott Davis, Lucy Hale, Jake Abel, Shamier Anderson, Julia Ormond, Cedric the Entertainer and Brian Dennehy in his final film role. Spike Lee serves as an executive producer.

It had its world premiere at the American Black Film Festival on August 26, 2020. It was released on February 5, 2021, by Clear Horizon Entertainment and Vertical Entertainment.

Plot
The film opens on April 5, 1961, and focuses on Bob Zellner, who is the son of a Methodist minister, a senior attending all-White Huntingdon College in Montgomery, Alabama. Seeking information with which to write research papers on race relations, Zellner and four fellow students attend an event held in a Baptist Black church to mark the fifth anniversary of the 1955-1956 Montgomery Bus Boycott.

The event is conducted by Ralph Abernathy and Rosa Parks. When police arrive to arrest them, the White students evade arrest by fleeing through a back door. Dubbed the 'Huntingdon Five' in a newspaper, a cross is burned on the yard outside Zellner's room by the KKK. Zellner's klansman grandfather J.O. warns him not to involve himself in the civil rights movement.

Witnessing a mob attack on the Freedom Riders on May 19, 1961, Zellner helps Jessica Mitford get to safety.
At first a passive supporter of the movement, Zellner goes on to become SNCC's first White field secretary. Facing suspicion at first from black SNCC activists, he proves his bona fides by protesting alongside them, narrowly escaping a lynching by rural, white southerners while in McComb, Mississippi after participating with a march to the county courthouse on October 30, 1961.

Following the murder of Herbert Lee, Zellner decides to leave the movement and continue his studies in the North. After a violent confrontation with a former "friend," who organized his attempted lynching, Zellner firmly changes course and then commits himself to the movement. The film ends with a montage of Zellner's activism during the '60s on civil rights, including tribute to his mentor, the late John Lewis.

Cast

Production

Development and pre-production
In February 2019, it was announced Barry Alexander Brown would direct the film, from a screenplay he wrote, while Colin Bates, Eve Pomerance, Bill Black, Stan Erdreich will serve as producers on the film, while Spike Lee and Frank Barwah will serve as executive producers. In April 2019, Lucas Till, Lucy Hale, Lex Scott Davis, Julia Ormond, Cedric the Entertainer, Mike Manning, Sharonne Lainer, Brian Dennehy, Chaka Forman, Shamier Anderson, Jake Abel, Ludi Lin, Onye Eme-Akwari, Dexter Darden, and Matt William Knowles joined the cast of the film.

Filming
Principal photography began in April 2019, in Montgomery, Alabama.

Release
The film had its world premiere at the American Black Film Festival on August 26, 2020. Prior to that, Clear Horizon Entertainment acquired U.S. distribution rights to the film. On January 14, 2021, it was announced along with the release of the trailer, that Vertical Entertainment will co-distribute the film in the U.S. and release it in theaters and VOD on February 5.

Reception
On Metacritic, the film holds a rating of 60 out of 100, based on 4 critics, indicating "mixed or average reviews".

See also
 Civil rights movement in popular culture

References

External links
 
 
 

2020 films
2020 biographical drama films
2020s American films
2020s English-language films
2020s historical drama films
2020s political drama films
American biographical drama films
American historical drama films
American political drama films
Biographical films about activists
Civil rights movement in film
Cultural depictions of Rosa Parks
Films about race and ethnicity
Films about racism in the United States
Films based on autobiographies
Films directed by Barry Alexander Brown
Films set in 1943
Films set in 1951
Films set in 1960
Films set in 1961
Films set in 1963
Films set in Alabama
Films set in Georgia (U.S. state)
Films set in Mississippi
Films set in Tennessee
Films shot in Alabama
Political films based on actual events
Vertical Entertainment films